François Picavet (17 May 1851, Petit-Fayt, Nord – 23 May 1921, Paris) was a French philosopher, translator and authority on Kant.

He is now best known for an 1891 essay, Les idéologues, on the history of ideas and of scientific theories, philosophy and religious and political ideas in France since 1789.

Works
 Mémoire sur le scepticisme (1884) 
 l'Histoire de la philosophie, ce qu'elle a été, ce qu'elle peut être (1888) 
 La Mettrie et la critique allemande (1888)
 Maine de Biran de l'an IX à l'an XI (1889)
 Les idéologues. Essai sur l'histoire des idées et des théories scientifiques, philosophiques, religieuses, etc. en France depuis 1789 (1891) online text, reprinted 1971 by Burt Franklin

External links
  
 Biography in French

1851 births
1921 deaths
19th-century essayists
19th-century French non-fiction writers
19th-century French philosophers
19th-century German non-fiction writers
19th-century German male writers
19th-century German philosophers
19th-century philosophers
19th-century French translators
French male essayists
French male non-fiction writers
French male writers
French people of German descent
German male essayists
German male non-fiction writers
German people of French descent
German translators
Kantian philosophers
Philosophers of culture
Philosophers of history
Philosophers of religion
Philosophers of science
Political philosophers
Social philosophers